The Ischigualasto Formation is a Late Triassic fossiliferous formation and Lagerstätte in the Ischigualasto-Villa Unión Basin of the southwestern La Rioja Province and northeastern San Juan Province in northwestern Argentina. The formation dates to the Carnian and Norian ages and ranges between 231.7 and 225 Ma, based on ash bed dating.

The formation is subdivided into four members, from old to young; La Peña, Cancha de Bochas, Valle de la Luna and Quebrada de la Sal. The sandstones, mudstones, conglomerates and tuffs of the formation were deposited in a humid alluvial to fluvial floodplain environment, characterized by strongly seasonal rainfall.

The Ischigualasto Formation is an important paleontological unit and considered a Lagerstätte, as it preserves several genera of early dinosaurs, other archosaurs, synapsids, and temnospondyls of the Late Triassic. Coprolites and fossil wood also have been found in the formation. The formation crops out in the in 1967 established Ischigualasto Provincial Park, which was designated a UNESCO World Heritage Site in 2000.

Etymology 
The name Ischigualasto is derived from the extinct Cacán language, spoken by an indigenous group referred to as the Diaguita by the Spanish conquistadors and means "place where the moon alights". The genus Ischigualastia and the species Herrerasaurus ischigualastensis, Pseudochampsa ischigualastensis, Pelorocephalus ischigualastensis and Protojuniperoxylon ischigualastianus were named after the formation.

Geology 

The formation is exposed in the Ischigualasto Provincial Park of La Rioja and San Juan Provinces. In the neighboring Talampaya National Park, the formation is thin and covered by recent sediments. The formation, part of the Agua de la Peña Group, overlies Los Rastros Formation and is overlain by Los Colorados Formation. The Ischigualasto Formation strongly contrasts with the bounding formation in color.

The Ischigualasto Formation comprises a sequence of fluvial channel sandstones with well-drained floodplain sandstones and mudstones, dominated by rivers and strongly seasonal rainfall has been estimated at time of deposition. The formation dates to the Carnian Pluvial Event. Interlayered volcanic ash layers above the base and below the top of the formation provide chronostratigraphic control and have yielded ages of 231.4 ± 0.3 Ma and 225.9 ± 0.9 Ma respectively.

The formation is approximately coeval with the upper Santa Maria Formation of the Paraná Basin in southeastern Brazil, the Pekin Formation of the United States and the lower Maleri Formation of India.

Subdivision 
The Ischigualasto Formation is subdivided into four members, from top to bottom:
 Quebrada de la Sal ~
 Valle de la Luna ~
 Cancha de Bochas ~
 La Peña ~

Paleontological significance 

The Ischigualasto Formation is highly fossiliferous and its unique paleontological characteristics made it a Lagerstätte; a stratigraphic unit containing a diverse faunal assemblage. The paleontological importance led to the establishment of the Ischigualasto Provincial Park, a UNESCO World Heritage Site since 2000.

The Ischigualasto Formation contains Late Triassic (Carnian) deposits (231.4 -225.9 million years before the present), with some of the oldest known dinosaur remains, which are the world's foremost with regards to quality, number and importance.

Rhynchosaurs and cynodonts (especially rhynchosaur Hyperodapedon and cynodont Exaeretodon) are by far the predominant findings among the tetrapod fossils in the park. A study from 1993 found dinosaur specimens to comprise only 6% of the total tetrapod sample; subsequent discoveries increased this number to approximately 11% of all findings. Carnivorous dinosaurs are the most common terrestrial carnivores of the Ischigualasto Formation, with herrerasaurids comprising 72% of all recovered terrestrial carnivores. The carnivorous archosaur Herrerasaurus is the most numerous of these dinosaur fossils. Another important putative dinosaur with primitive characteristics is Eoraptor lunensis, found in Ischigualasto in the early 1990s.

Fossil ferns and horsetails have also been found in the formation.

Coprolites were found in Valle Pintado in the upper part of the formation. Analysis of the coprolites revealed that plant remains were absent and bone material and apatite were sparse. The most likely candidate to have produced these fossil feces has been suggest as the most common reptile in the formation; Herrerasaurus.

Fossil content

Dinosaurs 
The fossils of an undescribed species of theropod are present in San Juan Province.

Other reptiles

Synapsids

Temnospondyls

Plants

See also 

 Quebrada del Barro Formation, contemporaneous fossiliferous formation of the Marrayel-El Carrizal Basin
 Candelária Formation, contemporaneous fossiliferous formation of the Paraná Basin
 Molteno Formation, contemporaneous fossiliferous formation of the Karoo Basin in southern Africa
 Fremouw Formation, contemporaneous fossiliferous formation of Antarctica
 Denmark Hill Insect Bed, contemporaneous fossiliferous unit of Queensland, Australia
 Madygen Formation, contemporaneous Lagerstätte of Central Asia

References

Bibliography 

Geology
 
 
 
 

Paleontology

Books

Further reading 

 F. Abdala. 2000. Catalogue of non-mammalian cynodonts in the Vertebrate Paleontology Collection of the Instituto Miguel Lillo, Universidad Nacional de Tucuman, with comments on species. Ameghiniana 37(4):463-475
 P. C. Sereno, C. A. Forster, R. R. Rogers and A. M. Monetta. 1993. Primitive dinosaur skeleton from Argentina and the early evolution of Dinosauria. Nature 361:64-66
 F. E. Novas. 1986. Un probable teropodo (Saurischia) de la Formacion Ischigualasto (Triasico Superior), San Juan, Argentina [A probable theropod (Saurischia) from the Ischigualasto Formation (Upper Triassic), San Juan, Argentina]. IV Congreso Argentino de Paleontologia y Bioestratigrafia 1:1-6
 V.H. Contreras. 1981. Datos preliminares sobre un nuevo rincosaurio (Reptilia, Rhynchosauria) del Triasico Superior de Argentina. Anais II Congresso Latino-Americano Paleontologia, Porto Alegre 2:289-294
 
 R. M. Casamiquela. 1967. Un nuevo dinosaurio ornitisquio triasico (Pisanosaurus mertii; Ornithopoda) de la Formación Ischigualasto, Argentina [A new Triassic ornithischian dinosaur (Pisanosaurus mertii; Ornithopoda) from the Ischigualasto Formation, Argentina]. Ameghiniana 4(2):47-64
 C. B. Cox. 1965. New Triassic dicynodonts from South America, their origins and relationships. Philosophical Transactions of the Royal Society of London, Series B 248(753):457-516
 O. A. Reig. 1963. La presencia de dinosaurios saurisquios en los "Estratos de Ischigualasto" (Mesotriasico Superior) de las provincias de San Juan y La Rioja (República Argentina) [The presence of saurischian dinosaurs in the "Ischigualasto beds" (upper Middle Triassic) of San Juan and La Rioja Provinces (Argentine Republic)]. Ameghiniana 3(1):3-20

 
Geologic formations of Argentina
Triassic Argentina
Sandstone formations
Mudstone formations
Conglomerate formations
Tuff formations
Alluvial deposits
Fluvial deposits
Fossiliferous stratigraphic units of South America
Paleontology in Argentina
Geology of La Rioja Province, Argentina
Geology of San Juan Province, Argentina
Quechuan languages
Diaguita